KOffice is a free and open source office and graphics suite developed by KDE for Unix-like and Windows systems. KOffice contains a word processor (KWord), a spreadsheet (KSpread), a presentation program (KPresenter), and a number of other components that varied over the course of its development.

KOffice was superseded by Calligra Suite in KDE. The KDE3 version is maintained by the Trinity Desktop project.

After development began in 1997, two major stable releases of KOffice were published: Version 1.0 in 2000 and 2.0 in 2009. Following internal conflicts, the majority of KOffice developers split off in 2010 – resulting in the creation of Calligra Suite. Two years later, in September 2012, the KOffice.org website went offline. It now redirects to Calligra.org.

History

First generation 
Initial work on KOffice development began in 1997, by Reginald Stadlbauer with KPresenter, followed by KWord in 1998.

In 1999, KOffice was cited in testimony in the United States v. Microsoft antitrust trial by then-Microsoft executive Paul Maritz as evidence of competition in the operating system and office suite arena.

The first official release of the KOffice suite was on 23 October 2000, when it was released as part of K Desktop Environment 2.0. Version 1.1 followed in 2001, 1.2 in 2002, 1.3 in 2004, 1.4 in 2005, and 1.5 and 1.6 both in 2006.

Second generation 
KOffice underwent a major transition as part of the release of KDE Software Compilation 4 (SC4). Coinciding with the work on SC4, the KOffice team prepared a major new release – KOffice 2.0 – which used the new KDE Platform 4 libraries. Although version 2.0 was released in 2009, the release was labeled as a “platform release” which was recommended only for testers and developers, rather than production use, since the release was missing key features and applications from the previous stable release series – Kexi, Kivio, and Kugar were not included.

This continued with version 2.1 in November, 2009. Regular end-users requiring a stable environment were still recommended by developers to use the stable 1.6 release series. This version was also ported to Haiku but the port was later not updated for newer KOffice versions.

In May 2010, version 2.2.0 was released and brought an unprecedented number of new features and bugfixes. Kexi was integrated again. Kivio was not migrated. A new framework for effects on shapes and a new import filters for the Microsoft Office Open XML formats used in MS Office 2007 and later was added.

Community split 

In mid-2010, following disagreements between KWord maintainer Thomas Zander and the other core developers, the KOffice community split into two separate communities, KOffice and Calligra. Following arbitration with the community members several applications were renamed by both communities. KOffice forked the KSpread spreadsheet utility to KCells, also the KPresenter presentation tool to KOffice Showcase, and the Karbon14 drawing tool to KOffice Artwork.

The community split coincided with the move from KDE's Subversion repository to git. The Krita painting application, the Kexi database manager, and dedicated mobile platform GUI files were not migrated into the KOffice git repository.

KOffice 2.3, released 31 December 2010, along with subsequent bugfix releases (2.3.1–2.3.3) was still a collaborative effort of both the KOffice and Calligra development teams. Kivio was still not integrated 

Beginning with KOffice 2.4 the developers aimed to release new KOffice versions every six months in sync with SC4 releases but KOffice had seen no development activity since mid-March 2012. As of September 2013, Calligra has released 2.4 and 2.5 and 2.6 and 2.7. After two minor commits in August 2012 the koffice.org website was replaced by a placeholder in early September 2012. On 22 October 2012 KDE removed KOffice from their Quality Website Tools.

 KOffice was declared unmaintained by KDE.

Components 
The last formally released version of KOffice included the following components:

Technical details 
KOffice applications were developed using Qt and KDE Platform. All its components are released under free software licenses and use OpenDocument as their native file format when possible. KOffice was released separately from KDE SC 4 and can be downloaded from KDE's FTP server.

KOffice 2 underwent a large overhaul to use the Flake system of components and Pigment color system, as much as possible within applications. KOffice developers planned to share as much infrastructure as possible between applications to reduce bugs and improve the user experience. They also wanted to create an OpenDocument library for use in other KDE applications that will allow developers to easily add support for reading and outputting OpenDocument files to their applications. Automating tasks and extending the suite with custom functionality can be done with D-Bus or with scripting languages like Python, Ruby, and JavaScript.

See also 

 Comparison of office suites
 List of office suites

References

External links 

 
 KOffice development home

Discontinued software
Free software programmed in C++
Office suites
Office suites for Linux
Open-source office suites
Software that uses Qt